Pasta e ceci is a dish common in Southern and Central Italy. It is made with pasta and chickpeas. It is part of the cucina povera, or peasant cuisine tradition in Italian cuisine.

History 
The dish has ancient origins, and was mentioned in the Roman poet Horace's Satires.

Variants 
The dish is popular in the region of Basilicata, where it is known as "piatto del brigante" ("the dish of the brigand"), as it is popularly believed to have been the favored dish of local brigands in the nineteenth century. In Campania the dish is popular in the province of Salerno and in Cilento. In both Basilicata and Campania the dish is usually prepared with lagane, a shape of pasta similar to tagliatelle, which was mentioned by Horace with the name Lagàne e ceci.

The Roman version of the dish makes use of anchovies.

In Puglia, the dish is known as ciceri e tria, a staple dish of the cuisine of Salento. The dish has been recognised by the Ministry of Agricultural, Food and Forestry Policies as a traditional Apulian product and is mentioned in the twenty-second revision of the list of products of 2020. According to the traditional recipe a portion of the pasta is fried and then re-added to the dish alongside chickpeas.

References

See also 
 Pasta e fagioli

  Wikimedia Commons on Pasta e ceci

Chickpea dishes
Pasta dishes
Italian cuisine